Dried fruit is fruit from which the majority of the original water content has been removed either naturally, through sun drying, or through the use of specialized dryers or dehydrators. Dried fruit has a long tradition of use dating back to the fourth millennium BC in Mesopotamia, and is prized because of its sweet taste, nutritive value, and long shelf life.

Today, dried fruit consumption is widespread. Nearly half of the dried fruits sold are raisins, followed by dates, prunes, figs, apricots, peaches, apples, and pears. These are referred to as "conventional" or "traditional" dried fruits: fruits that have been dried in the sun or in heated wind tunnel dryers. Many fruits such as cranberries, blueberries, cherries, strawberries, and mango are infused with a sweetener (e.g. sucrose syrup) prior to drying. Some products sold as dried fruit, like papaya, kiwifruit and pineapple, are most often candied fruit. 

Dried fruits retain most of the nutritional value of fresh fruits. The specific nutrient content of the different dried fruits reflects their fresh counterpart and the processing method.

History

Traditional dried fruit such as raisins, figs, dates, apricots and apples have been a staple of Mediterranean diets for millennia. This is due partly to their early cultivation in the Middle Eastern region known as the Fertile Crescent, made up by parts of modern Iran, Iraq, southwest Turkey, Syria, Lebanon, Palestine, Israel, and northern Egypt. Drying or dehydration also happened to be the earliest form of food preservation: grapes, dates, and figs that fell from the tree or vine would dry in the hot sun. Early hunter-gatherers observed that these fallen fruit took on an edible form, and valued them for their stability as well as their concentrated sweetness.

The earliest recorded mention of dried fruits can be found in Mesopotamian tablets dating to about 1500 BC, which contain what are probably the oldest known written recipes. These clay slabs, written in Akkadian, the daily language of Babylonia, were inscribed in cuneiform and tell of diets based on grains (barley, millet, wheat), vegetables and fruits such as dates, figs, apples, pomegranates, and grapes. These early civilizations used dates, date juice evaporated into syrup and raisins as sweeteners. They included dried fruits in their breads for which they had more than 300 recipes, from simple barley bread for the workers to very elaborate, spiced cakes with honey for the palaces and temples.

The date palm was one of the first cultivated trees. It was domesticated in Mesopotamia more than 5,000 years ago. It grew abundantly in the Fertile Crescent and it was so productive (an average date palm produces 50 kg (100 lbs) of fruit a year for 60 years or more) that dates were the cheapest of staple foods. Because they were so valuable, they were well recorded in Assyrian and Babylonian monuments and temples. The villagers in Mesopotamia dried them and ate them as sweets. Whether fresh, soft-dried or hard-dried, they helped to give character to meat dishes and grain pies. They were valued by travelers for their energy and were recommended as stimulants against fatigue.

Figs were also prized in early Mesopotamia, Palestine, Israel, and Egypt where their daily use was probably greater than or equal to that of dates. As well as appearing in wall paintings, many specimens have been found in Egyptian tombs as funerary offerings. In Greece and Crete, figs grew very readily and they were the staple of poor and rich alike, particularly in their dried form.

Grape cultivation first began in Armenia and the eastern regions of the Mediterranean in the 4th century BC. Raisins were produced by drying grapes in the hot desert sun. Very quickly, viticulture and raisin production spread across northern Africa including Morocco and Tunisia. The Phoenicians and the Egyptians popularized the production of raisins, probably due to the perfect arid environment for sun drying. They put them in jars for storage and allotted them to the different temples by the thousands. They also added them to breads and various pastries, some made with honey, some with milk and eggs.

From the Middle East, these fruits spread through Greece to Italy where they became a major part of the diet. Ancient Romans consumed raisins in spectacular quantities and at all levels of society, including them as a key part of their common meals, along with olives and fresh fruits. Raisined breads were common for breakfast and were consumed with their grains, beans, and cultured milks. Raisins were so valued that they transcended the food realm and became rewards for successful athletes, as well as premium barter currency.

Having dried fruits was essential in ancient Rome as these instructions for housekeepers around 100 BC tell: "She must keep a supply of cooked food on hand for you and the servants. She must keep many hens and have plenty of eggs. She must have a large store of dried pears, sorbs, figs, raisins, sorbs in must, preserved pears and grapes and quinces. She must also keep preserved grapes in grape-pulp and in pots buried in the ground, as well as fresh Praenestine nuts kept in the same way, and Scantian quinces in jars, and other fruits that are usually preserved, as well as wild fruits. All these she must store away diligently every year."

Figs were also extremely popular in Rome. Dried figs were added to bread and formed a major part of the winter food of country people. They were rubbed with spices such as cumin, anise and fennel seeds, or toasted sesame, wrapped in fig leaves and stored in jars. Today, major producing regions include Israel, Jerusalem, Gaza and many other Arabic countries. Dried figs are rich in vitamins, phosphorus and various other important minerals.

Plums, apricots and peaches had their origins in Asia. They were domesticated in China in the 3rd millennium BC and spread to the Fertile Crescent where they were also very popular, fresh and dried alike. They arrived in Greece and Italy much later and were very expensive but valued in the preparation of gourmet dishes with port or stewed with honey and spices.

Production 

Today, dried fruit is produced in most regions of the world, and consumption occurs in all cultures and demographic segments. Raisins accounted for about two thirds of this. California produces the largest percentage of the US and the world's dried fruit crop. It accounts for over 99% of the US crop of raisins and dried plums, 98% of dried figs, 96% of dried peaches, 92% of apricots and over 90% of dates. Most of California dried fruit production is centered in the San Joaquin Valley where the soil and climate, especially the hot, dry summers, provide ideal growing conditions. While these fruits were commonly dried in the sun in the past, now only raisins are almost entirely naturally sun-dried.

Fruits can be dried whole (e.g., grapes, berries, apricot, plum), in halves, or as slices, (e.g., mango, papaya, kiwi). Alternatively, they can be chopped after drying (e.g., dates), made into pastes, or concentrated juices. The residual moisture content can vary from small (3 – 8%) to substantial (16 – 18%), depending on the type of fruit. Fruits can also be dried in puree form, as leather, or as a powder, by spray or drum drying. They can be freeze dried. Fresh fruit is frozen and placed in a drying chamber under a vacuum. Heat is applied and water evaporates from the fruit while still frozen". The fruit becomes very light and crispy and retains much of its original flavor. Dried fruit is widely used by the confectionery, baking, and sweets industries. Food manufacturing plants use dried fruits in various sauces, soups, marinades, garnishes, puddings, and food for infants and children.

As ingredients in prepared food, dried fruit juices, purées, and pastes impart sensory and functional characteristics to recipes:

 The high fiber content provides water-absorbing and water-binding capabilities, tenderization, and nutritional enhancement.
 Organic acids such as sorbitol act as humectants, provide dough and batter stability, and control water activity.
 Fruit sugars add sweetness, humectancy, and surface browning, and control water activity.
 Fruit acids, such as malic acid and tartaric acid, contribute to flavor enhancement and act as anti-microbial agents (suppress mold and bacterial growth).
 Vitamins and minerals increase nutritional value and label appeal.
 Phenolic compounds slow down lipid oxidation in meats. They add a natural caramel color.

The high drying and processing temperatures, the intrinsic low pH of the fruit, the low water activity (moisture content) and the presence of natural antimicrobial compounds in dried fruit make them a stable food. Incident of a food-borne illness related to dried fruit are not known.

Sulfur dioxide is used as an antioxidant in some dried fruits to protect their color and flavor. For example, in golden raisins, dried peaches, apples, and apricots, sulfur dioxide is used to keep them from losing their light color by blocking browning reactions that darken fruit and alter their flavor. Over the years, sulfur dioxide and sulfites have been used by many populations for a variety of purposes. Sulfur dioxide was first employed as a food additive in 1664, and was later approved for such use in the United States as far back as the 1800s.

Sulfur dioxide, while harmless to healthy individuals, can induce asthma when inhaled or ingested by sensitive people. The U.S. Food and Drug Administration (FDA) estimates that one out of a hundred people is sulfite-sensitive, and about 5% of asthmatics are also at risk of suffering an adverse reaction. Given that about 10% of the population suffers from asthma, this figure translates to 0.5% of the whole population with potential for sulfite-sensitivity. These individuals make up the subgroup of greatest concern and are largely aware of the need to avoid sulfite-containing foods. Consequently, the FDA requires food manufacturers and processors to disclose the presence of sulfiting agents in concentrations of at least 10 parts per million.

In Taipei, Taiwan, a 2010 city health survey found one-third of tested dried fruit products failed health standard tests, most having excessive amounts of sodium cyclamate, some at levels 20 times higher than the legal limit.

Turkey exported 1.5 billion dollars of dried fruit in 2021 and became the world's largest exporter of dried fruit.

Health

Glycemic index 

Traditional dried fruit have a low to moderate Glycemic Index (GI) – a measure of how a food affects blood sugar levels. GI measures an individual's response to eating a carbohydrate-containing food (usually 50 grams of available carbohydrates) compared to the individual's response to the same amount of carbohydrates from either white bread  or glucose. Carbohydrate-containing foods are classified as high (above 70), moderate (56–69), or low (0–55) GI. Foods with high fiber content generally have a low GI. However, other factors also contribute to a food's glycemic response, such as the type of carbohydrate or sugar present, the physical characteristic of the food matrix and the presence of organic acids. All studies assessing the GI of dried fruit show that they are low to moderate GI foods and that the insulin response is proportional to their GI. Factors thought to contribute to this glycemic response include the viscous texture of dried fruits when chewed; their whole food matrix; the presence of phenolic compounds and organic acids and the type of sugar present (about 50% fructose in most traditional dried fruit).

Research

Consumption of dried fruit is under preliminary research for the potential to improve nutrition and affect chronic diseases.

Types

Dehydration methods 
People have practiced food preservation since ancient times. Many folktales describe ways of preserving foods in one way or another according to local and cultural traditions. Dehydration Methods help to prevent food from spoilage and to maintain it for a longer period of time while keeping it suitable for consumption. Reducing the amount of water in fruits helps prevent bacteria, yeast or fungi from growing on them. There are several processes that can be used in the production of dried fruit, each of which affects its appearance, rehydration properties, and nutrients differently. These drying processes include sun drying, tray (air) drying, freeze drying, and vacuum microwave drying. Each process has its own benefits and disadvantages.

Sun drying 

This process uses sun-exposure as its thermal source, combined with natural airflow. It is also a traditional drying method to reduce the moisture of fruits by spreading under the sun. Warmer temperatures evaporate the moisture and lower humidity allows moisture to move quickly from the fruit to the air. However, there are many disadvantages associated such as the longer time required to dry, hot climate and daylight, and risk of invasion by animals and unwanted microorganisms.

Tray drying 
A tray dryer is similar to a convection drier, which is placed in enclosed insulated chambers and trays on top of each other in the tray. Input materials are batch fed, placed in trays and loaded into ovens for drying. Dryers are used in processing where drying and heating is an important part of the industrial manufacturing process, like dried fruits. Tray drying means dehydrating small pieces of fruits from a source of hot dry air or the sun until it is dry enough to store at ambient temperature with minimal spoilage. Despite its poor re-hydration properties and shrunken appearance, this process requires a short period of time along with controlled humidity and heated air.

Freeze drying 
Freeze-dried is a special form of drying that removes all moisture and has less effect on the taste of food than normal dehydration. Freeze drying is a water removal process commonly used to preserve pear material, the fruit is placed in a vacuum chamber in low heat to increase shelf life. This process works by freezing the material, then reducing the pressure and adding heat to neutralize the frozen water in the material. Unlike the other drying methods, this method allows the dried mango to retain its shape, retain the highest color value, and provide a great rehydration property despite its high costs. Foods that contain adequate amounts of water are very easy to work with and will maintain their initial shape after the freeze-drying process is complete.

Vacuum microwave drying 
The microwave generates a specific amount of energy, easily shortening the drying time. In addition, the boiling point of water is lowered under vacuum, causing a high temperature inside the dried particles on the surface of the product. Microwave vacuum drying is a dehydration process that uses microwave radiation to generate heat at full pressure (chamber pressure). During vacuum drying, high-energy water molecules propagate to the surface and evaporate due to low pressure. Due to the absence of air, vacuum drying inhibits oxidation and maintains the color, texture and taste of dried products. This device can improve the quality of products and the equipment can prolong the shelf life of food, preserve the original taste and nutrients of food, maintain physical activity of raw materials, enhance the function of healthy food and increase the value of agricultural products can do. This method provides better flavor retention, greater rehydration, least nutrient loss and least color change among another thermal drying along with a faster drying rate compared to freeze drying. Vacuum microwave not only dries the mango quickly, it also reduces the amount of fibers and the microorganisms present in the pulpy part of the fruit. The fruit taste is distorted at some rate. The vacuum drying also reduces the amount of water contained and in a closed environment no other microorganism can enter into the fruit.

Gallery

See also 
 List of dried foods
 List of seeds, nuts and fruit for snack
 Swedish fruit soup – a soup prepared using dried fruits

References

Further reading 
 Al-Sahib W and Marshall RJ. "The fruit of the date palm: Its possible use as the best food for the future?" J Food Science Nutr 2003; 54: 247–59
 Barta J. Fruit Drying Principles (Chapter 5) In: Handbook of Fruits and Fruit Processing Hui YH. Ed. Blackwell Publishing, Iowa (2006)
Carughi A. "Health Benefits of Sun-Dried Raisins". http://www.raisins.net/Raisins_and_Health_200810.pdf
 Grivetti LE and Applegate EA. "From Olympia to Atlanta: Agricultural-historic perspective on diet and athletic training". J Clinical Nutr 1997; 127:S860–868
 Hooshmand S and Arjmandi BH. "Viewpoint: Dried plum, and emerging functional food that may effectively improve bone health". Ageing Res Reviews 2009; 8: 122–7
Ratti C and Mujumdar AS. Drying of Fruit (Chapter 7) In: Processing Fruit Barrett DM, Somogyi L and Ramaswamy H. Eds.CRC Press, New York (2005)
 

 
Snack foods
Dried foods